is a Japanese director.

He had worked as an assistant director of Satsuo Yamamoto from 1962 to 1978. He directed his first film in 1978. His 2009 film Beauty was entered into the 31st Moscow International Film Festival.

Filmography

Director 
 1982, Matagi ("bear hunter"), also known as The Old Bear Hunter – director and writer

Editing 
 Yojaso no maō

References

External links
 

1938 births
Living people
Japanese film directors
Rikkyo University alumni